Egmore Metro station is a Metro railway station on Line 2 of the Chennai Metro. The station is among the underground stations coming up along corridor II of the Chennai Metro, Chennai Central–St. Thomas Mount stretch. The station will serve the neighbourhoods of Egmore and Vepery.

History

Construction

The station
The station covers an area of about 8,000 square meter and is located adjacent to the Egmore railway station. The station has four entry and exit points.

Structure
Egmore is underground Metro station situated on Green Line (Chennai Metro).

Station layout

Facilities
List of available ATM at Egmore metro station are

Connections

Bus
Metropolitan Transport Corporation (Chennai) bus routes number 15A, 15B, 20, 23A, 28, 28A, 28B, 53A, 53E, 120K, serves the station from nearby Egmore bus stand.

Rail
Chennai Egmore railway station

Entry/Exit

See also

 Chennai
 Chetput (Chennai)
 Chetput Lake
 List of Chennai metro stations
 Chennai Metro
 Railway stations in Chennai
 Chennai Mass Rapid Transit System
 Chennai Monorail
 Chennai Suburban Railway
 Chetput railway station
 Transport in Chennai
 Urban rail transit in India
 List of metro systems

References

External links

 
 UrbanRail.Net – descriptions of all metro systems in the world, each with a schematic map showing all stations.

Chennai Metro stations
Railway stations in Chennai